Boniface of Ragusa (Lopud – 6 February 1582 Timișoara) was a Franciscan Custos of the Holy Land in Jerusalem, writer, who served as Bishop of Ston (1564–1582).

Biography

Destefanis' other names include Bonifacije Stefanić Drakolica, Darcoliza, Drakolica, Crassa, Grassa, Ragusinus, Stephani, Drkoličić and Stjepanović.

Destefanis was ordained a priest in the Order of Friars Minor.  Destefanis participated at the Council of Trent In 1551-1559 and 1564, he was  Custodian of the Holy Land. Allegedly, he participated in the last time the Holy Sepulchre was opened in 1555. He obtained permission to restore parts of the Church of the Holy Sepulchre and to build a completely new edicule. This was a major restoration project, and the Franciscan left a detailed description of the work carried out. On 17 Nov 1564, he was appointed by Pope Pius IV as Bishop of Ston. 
In 1580 Destefanis, accompanied by Bartol Sfondrati, was appointed as apostolic visitor and delegate to Dalmatia, Herzegovina, Bosnia, Croatia, Vallachia, Slavonia, Serbia and other European territories governed by the Ottomans. Before this trip, based on Pope's instructions, Destefanis visited Franciscan province in Bosnia. On 15 December 1580 Destefanis reported to Rome that he met bishop of Smederevo, fra Nikola Ugrinović, during his journey to Bosnia. Since there were only five Catholic families in Smederevo, Destefanis proposed to move Ugrinović to Skradin.

He served as Bishop of Ston until his death in 1582.

Works
 De perenni Cultu Terrae Sanctae (1555), Venice 1572
 Liber De perenni Cultu Terrae Sanctae Et De Fructuosa eius Peregrinatione, Venice 1573

References

Sources 

 
 
 
 
 

1582 deaths
16th-century Roman Catholic archbishops in the Republic of Venice
Bishops appointed by Pope Pius IV
Franciscan bishops
Custodians of the Holy Land
Friars Minor
Year of birth uncertain